Dhanya may refer to:

 Dhanya (film), a 1981 Indian Malayalam film
 Dhanya (beetle), a genus of beetles in the family Carabidae

People 
 Dhanya Balakrishna, Indian actress
 Dhanya Manikya (died 1515), Maharaja of Tripura from 1463
 Dhanya Mary Varghese (born 1985), Indian actress